This is a list of video games published by Deep Silver.

List of video games

Distributed titles

References 

 
Deep Silver